The ATL Project is the debut studio album by ATL released on May 4th, 2004.

This album marks the first appearance of then-unknown American singer Ciara. This album and the two songs she's featured on "It's Us" and "I Wish" were released on May 4th, 2004. Whereas Ciara's first single "Goodies" didn't release until the next month on June 8th, 2004.

Track listing

NB: The last song, "No More" contains a sample of Aaliyah's posthumously released song "Miss You".

Other recorded songs
 "I Know."
 "Dangerous (For the Record)"
 "One"
 "Too Perfect for Me"

References

2004 debut albums
Albums produced by Jazze Pha
Albums produced by R. Kelly